Varroa is a genus of parasitic mesostigmatan mites associated with honey bees, placed in its own family, Varroidae. The genus was named for Marcus Terentius Varro, a Roman scholar and beekeeper. The condition of a honeybee colony being infested with Varroa mites is called varroosis (also, incorrectly, varroatosis).

Varroa mites, specifically the species Varroa destructor, are recognised as the biggest pest to honeybees worldwide due to their ability to transmit diseases such as deformed wing virus (or DWV) to larval or pupating bees, resulting in death or severe deformity of the pupae.

History and behavior
Varroa mites feed off the fat body tissue of adult, pupal, and larval honey bees, and may carry viruses that are particularly damaging to the bees (e.g., deformed wings, and IAPV), and accordingly they have been implicated in colony collapse disorder. Research has indicated that alone, neither Varroa mites nor deformed wing virus are particularly deadly, yet together they can pose an incredible risk to colonies.

Varroa mites were first discovered in Java  about 1904, but are now present in all honey bee populations except the Isle of Man and Isle of Colonsay. Because of the lack of varroa in Isle of Man, on February 16, 2015, the EU made a decision that allowed the Isle of Man to block the importation of all bee-related supplies.

They were discovered in the United States in 1987, in New Zealand in 2000, and in the United Kingdom in 1992.

Australia was free of the mites until a routine inspection at the Port of Newcastle on 22 June, 2022 detected an infestation. Eradication is unlikely because no other introduction elsewhere in the world has been eradicated.

Bee-breeding efforts to develop resistance against Varroa are ongoing. The USDA has developed a line of bees which uses Varroa-sensitive hygiene to remove reproductive mites. This line is now being distributed to beekeepers to be used as part of their integrated pest management programs.

Species
The genus Varroa contains these species:
 Varroa destructor Anderson & Trueman, 2000 is a virulent parasite that infests its natural host, Apis cerana (Asian honey bees), on mainland Asia and also Apis mellifera (western honey bee)  worldwide.
 Varroa jacobsoni Oudemans, 1904 is a relatively benign parasite of Apis cerana.
 Varroa rindereri de Guzman & Delfinado-Baker, 1996
 Varroa sinhai (Delfinado & Baker, 1974)
 Varroa wongsirii (Lekprayoon & Tangkanasing, 1991)

Resistance
Some honey bees strains have been bred to be resistant to Varroa, through Varroa sensitive hygiene (VSH) behavior, enabling them to detect reproducing varroa mites and diseased pupae within capped cells, which are then uncapped and the pupae removed.

References

External links

Mesostigmata
Beekeeping
Parasites of bees
Taxa named by Anthonie Cornelis Oudemans